Katherine Elizabeth Callan (née Borman; January 9, 1936) is an American author and actress known for playing Clark Kent's mother Martha in the ABC television series Lois & Clark: The New Adventures of Superman.

Early years
Callan was born in Dallas, Texas. When she was 5 years old, she felt that she wanted to act. She did so in school, and as a student at North Texas State University at Denton, she studied drama. She went on to teach drama at a Catholic girls' school, and she began a children's theater.

Career
Callan first appeared on television in an episode of Route 66 that happened to be shooting in Dallas. She resumed her on-camera career in 1970, guest-starring in roles on One Day at a Time, St. Elsewhere, Carnivàle, JAG, Coach and King of the Hill. She played a key role in the Emmy Award-winning episode "Cousin Liz" of All in the Family and portrayed the mother of April Stevens Ewing in several episodes of the penultimate season of Dallas. She played Daisy LaRue in the TV show Meet the Browns and appeared as Mrs. Monroe, Gabe Duncan's teacher, in Good Luck Charlie. She also appeared in the third-season finale of Desperate Housewives as Ilene Britt, the mother of Edie Britt (Nicollette Sheridan), and has portrayed Lily's maternal grandmother on several episodes of How I Met Your Mother. She played the part of Charlie (as an elderly woman) in Heroes for one episode.

She appeared in the films Joe (1970), A Touch of Class (1973), The Onion Field (1979), American Gigolo (1980), A Change of Seasons (1980), Fast-Walking (1982), and Knives Out (2019), as well as the 1972 television adaptation of the 1966 Lanford Wilson play The Rimers of Eldritch.

She has written several books, including The Los Angeles Agent, The Script Is Finished, Now What Do I Do?, Directing Your Directing Career, and How to Sell Yourself as an Actor. She received her acting training at HB Studio in New York City.

Callan made TV commercials for products, including Anacin, Endust, Geritol, and Sanka.

Personal life
Callan was married to and divorced from author James Ruskin Callan. The couple have three children, Jamie Callan,  Kelly Callan, and Kristi Callan.

Filmography

Film

Television

References

Bibliography

External links
 
 
 

1936 births
Living people
American film actresses
American television actresses
Writers from Texas
Actresses from Dallas
20th-century American actresses
21st-century American actresses